Embden may refer to:

Places
Embden, an ancient name of the city of Emden, Germany
Embden, Maine, United States
Embden, North Dakota, United States

Other uses
 Embden (goose), a German breed of domestic goose

People with the surname
Gustav Embden (1874–1933), German physiological chemist
David van Embden (1875–1962), Dutch politician

See also

Emden (disambiguation)